Đặng Thu Thảo is a Vietnamese beauty pageant titleholder who was crowned Miss Vietnam 2012, also the first ever contestant from the furthest South West of Vietnam to be Miss Vietnam.

Biography
She is the second child and has an elder brother. Her father is Dang Van Dat, who used to be a teacher but quit due to illness, later become a farmer at a fish farm. Her mother is Nguyen Hong Tho who is a tailor. They own Tan Dat fish farm in Ngan Dua Town. When first moving out after getting married, her family's income mostly came from her father's salary for teaching which was not a lot, while her mother worked as a farmer and part time tailor. Living in remote area and under poor condition, normally it took hours for them to go to the closest hospital in order to have treatment, by a boat.

Her parents later moved to Hong Dan District for fish selling business, moreover it would be more convenient for their children's education. Their business faced lots of difficulties and struggles, however, it became more stable time after time. In 2005, her house was evacuated due to the building of district's administrative headquarter. Therefore, the fish farm was moved to Thong Nhat Ward, in Ngan Dua Town, following their relocation.

Her family couldn't afford the tuition fee in university right after highschool graduation. She asked for her mom's permission that she would start to work in 1 year in order to earn money for tuition fee. At first, she learned make up skill and met Dang Hung - a well known make up artist in Can Tho who later advised her to compete in beauty pageant, however she neglected it and focused on working.

She moved to Can Tho City to work as a cosmetic seller in supermarket. Due to her work requirement which she needed to wear make up everyday made her concerned about her skin condition, she decided to quit her job to become drink mixer. However, her job was time-consuming so she quit again to focus on her education.

Activity 
After the crowning, she said that she would give away 30% of her 300 million prize for charity, a part for her hometown Bac Lieu, a part as a gift for Da Nang City and a part for people living in unfortunate conditions in Can Tho City. She donated two tons of rice to Charity Kitchen for Hong Dan District's hospital; visiting children in Tumor Department in Hanoi Hospital on September 12, 2012. She also came to Thanh Hoa to visit people who had survived in the serious flash flood in September 2012.

Controversy

Education 
Shortly after her crowning, there were plenty mixed critics targeting at her. It was said that she was not a student at Tay Do University as she had stated in her beauty pageant registration, one of her classmates said that she hadn't passed the college graduation and not even a college student. However, Mr. Phan Van Thom - principle of Tay Do University gave some evidences to prove that she was granted to take the exam twice, which was not allowed to be public, however everyone was still confused about this incident. Later, the organizer of Miss Vietnam 2016 said that she took university entry exam with another 25 people so "being specially treated is not this case"

Father's fault 
Later, it was said by the press that her father - Mr. Dang Van Dat caused accident for the teacher named Xuan which made her paralyzed ever since. Her mother stated that they had already pay the compensation for Xuan according to the court's order. She used to visit Xuan herself, in which she explained why did she not do it earlier due to the tension of Xuan's family toward her and her family, also she wasn't clear of Xuan's condition.

Pageantry

Miss Vietnam 2012
Đặng Thu Thảo is 25 years old and stands . She was Miss Vietnam 2012 winner.

Thao is praised as one of the most beautiful Misses Vietnam so far. She is also complimented for her no-scandal life and her activities for the community. Thao twice refused to represent Vietnam at the Miss World 2012 and 2013.

References

External links
Official Miss Universe Vietnam Organization Facebook

1991 births
Living people
Miss Vietnam winners
Miss International 2014 delegates
Vietnamese beauty pageant winners
People from Bạc Liêu Province